Henry Jones IXL was a company primarily known as a manufacturer of jams, conserves and sauces in Australia. The brand was owned and its products manufactured by SPC Ardmona from 2004, which was itself owned by Coca-Cola Amatil from February 2005.

SPC acquired IXL and Taylors brands in 2004, and sold both brands with the Kyabram factory in 2019 to a group of farmers and growers in the Goulburn Valley. The new owners have Malaysian investment.

History
The company was first established by Henry Jones in Hobart in 1891 as H. Jones & Company. The company derived from Jones' employment with George Peacock's jam factory from 1874. In 1895 the company purchased a building in Melbourne and commenced manufacture of jams and spreads. The building became known as The Jam Factory. IXL formed as a limited liability company in 1903. The IXL brand – 'I excel in everything I do' was Henry Jones's personal motto.

Throughout most of the twentieth century Henry Jones IXL thrived as a food processing company with IXL a leading brand. In 2004 the Henry Jones IXL business was the leading manufacturer of fruit spreads in Australia, with 30.2 per cent of the market, ahead of Cadbury Schweppes's Monbulk and Cottee's labels.

In 1974 Elder Smith Goldsbrough Mort & Co Ltd merged with Henry Jones IXL to form Elders IXL under the managing directorship of prominent businessman, John Dorman Elliott. It was subsequently sold in 1989 to The J.M. Smucker Co. based in the USA. In 2004 Australian food company SPC Ardmona Ltd, based in Shepparton, bought the Henry Jones IXL business for $51 million.

The primary processing plant of the Henry Jones Foods business was located in Kyabram, in Victoria's Goulburn Valley and is close to SPC Ardmona's manufacturing sites at Shepparton and Mooroopna.

Products produced and marketed under the IXL brand by SPC Ardmona include fruit bars, fruit snacks, and a wide range of fruit spreads, including gourmet, low sugar, and tumbler ranges.

On 25 February 2005, IXL, as part of SPC Ardmona, was bought by Coca-Cola Amatil.

In 2019, the IXL brand and Kyabram factory were sold to Kyabram Jam Company, in conjunction with Coca-Cola Amatil selling SPC. Kyabram Jam Factory is majority owned by Malaysian Holstein Milk Company.

Brands
IXL is an iconic Australian brand name, associated with jams and other fruit based products. A familiar feature of many Australian kitchens are the glass tumblers in which IXL brand jams are often sold.

IXL was the flagship brand of Henry Michael Jones IXL, which was founded in Hobart, Tasmania in 1891 (as H. Jones & Co.), and expanded to the mainland shortly thereafter, purchasing a building in Melbourne in 1895.

The name IXL is said to derive from the founders personal motto (variously quoted as 'I excel in everything I do' or 'I will excel in everything I do') however a manufacturer of stoves and other household appliances and fixtures based in Geelong, near Melbourne had been using the brandname IXL for some 30 years before H. Jones & Co. was established.

Timeline
Source: 
 In 1891, Henry Jones established the company, "H. Jones & Company".
 In 1974, Henry Jones IXL merged with Elders to form Elders IXL.
 In 1989, Henry Jones IXL was sold to The J.M. Smucker Co. based in the USA.
 In 2004, Australian food company SPC Ardmona Ltd, bought the Henry Jones IXL business for $51 million.
 In 2005, Coca-Cola Amatil bought SPC Ardmona (IXL parent company).
 In 2019, both the Kyabram factory and IXL brand were bought by Kyabram Jam Company

See also
 The Jam Factory
 SPC Ardmona
 Elders IXL
 The J.M. Smucker Co.

References

External links
SPC Ardmona
IXL

Food and drink companies of Australia
Australian brands
Australian jam and preserved fruit makers
Companies based in Tasmania
Food and drink companies established in 1891
Australian companies established in 1891